Autodelta SpA was the name of Alfa Romeo's competition department.  Established in 1961 as Auto-Delta, the company was started by Carlo Chiti and Lodovico Chizzola, former Alfa Romeo and Ferrari engineers.  The team was officially made a department of Alfa Romeo on March 5, 1963.  The team was originally based in Feletto Umberto, Udine, before moving closer to Alfa Romeo's facilities in Settimo Milanese in 1964 and officially becoming Autodelta SpA.  This allowed Autodelta to use the Balocco test track for new racing cars and prototypes.

The purpose of the company was bringing Alfa Romeo back to the top level of motor racing after Alfa Romeo's success in the 1950s.  The first car developed together with Alfa Romeo and Autodelta was the Giulia TZ introduced in June 1962.  The TZ was updated to TZ2 in 1965, with both cars taking many wins in various championships.  Alfa Romeo and Autodelta would later introduce the GTA to even more success.

After success in grand tourer racing, Chiti persuaded Alfa Romeo to develop sportscars for the World Sportscar Championship.  Alfa Romeo built 2.0, 2.5 and 3.0 litre V8 engines, and later a flat-12 for what would become the Tipo 33 racing car.  This racing program led to Alfa Romeo winning the constructors championships in 1975 and 1977. Autodelta manufactured a road going version of the Tipo 33, the Alfa Romeo 33 Stradale between 1967 and 1969.

After winning the sportscar championships, Alfa Romeo turned to supplying engines to the Brabham Formula One team and eventually returned to the sport with a factory team in 1979, run by Autodelta. The team also prepared Alfa Romeo rally cars such as the Alfetta GTVs. 

Although the division was eventually phased out, Alfa Romeo used the Autodelta name again for their AutoDelta Squadra Corse team in the European Touring Car Championship run by N.Technology.

Race results

Victories in the sports car world championship

See also 
Alfa Romeo in motorsport
Alfa Romeo in Formula One
Alfa Corse

References

External links
 Autodelta factory photographs

Alfa Romeo in motorsport
Italian auto racing teams
Sports car racing teams
24 Hours of Le Mans teams
Can-Am entrants
Automotive motorsports and performance companies